Leonid Nikolaevich Moseyev (born October 21, 1952 in Metlyno, Chelyabinsk Oblast) is a retired male long-distance runner from the Soviet Union.

Moseyev won the gold medal in the men's marathon at the 1978 European Championships in Prague.

He twice competed in the same event for the Soviet Union at the Summer Olympics in 1976 and 1980, finishing 7th and 5th respectively.

Achievements

External links 
1978 Year Ranking

1952 births
Living people
Soviet male long-distance runners
Russian male long-distance runners
Olympic athletes of the Soviet Union
Athletes (track and field) at the 1976 Summer Olympics
Athletes (track and field) at the 1980 Summer Olympics
European Athletics Championships medalists
Universiade medalists in athletics (track and field)
People from Ozyorsk, Chelyabinsk Oblast
Universiade gold medalists for the Soviet Union
Medalists at the 1977 Summer Universiade
Sportspeople from Chelyabinsk Oblast